The Progressive Conservative Party of Ontario ran a full slate of 117 candidates in the 1971 provincial election, seventy-eight of whom were elected. The Progressive Conservatives emerged as the largest party in the legislature for the ninth consecutive time, with an eighth consecutive majority government. Information about the party's candidates may be found here.

Candidates

Brant: J. Pryor Harris
J. Pryor Harris (died April 8, 2010) served in the Royal Canadian Air Force as an instrument technician during World War II. He moved to Burford, Ontario after the war and in 1945 opened a jewelry shop that he would own and operate for the rest of his life. He was a town councillor and deputy reeve in Burford and a member of the Holy Trinity Anglican Church, the Royal Canadian Legion, and the Burford Masonic Lodge. In 2001, he was given a lifetime achievement award by the Brantford Regional Chamber of Commerce.

Harris ran for the Progressive Conservatives in two elections against Liberal Party leader Robert Nixon. He was a lifelong member of the Conservative Party of Canada and its antecedents.

References

1971